Macquarie Grammar School is a private, independent, secular, non-selective, coeducational school, established in 2004, that operates within the policies of the NESA, NSW. It is located in Sydney CBD.  It was the only school to have a float in the 2014 Sydney Gay and Lesbian Mardi Gras.

References 

Educational institutions established in 2004
Grammar schools in Australia
Private secondary schools in Sydney
Buildings and structures in Sydney
2004 establishments in Australia